Brigadier Gerard is a 1915 British silent action film directed by Bert Haldane and starring Lewis Waller, Madge Titheradge and A.E. George. It is based on the 1896 short story collectionThe Adventures of Gerard by Arthur Conan Doyle which follows a fictional French cavalry officer during the Napoleonic Wars.

Cast
 Lewis Waller - Brigadier Gerard 
 Madge Titheradge - Countess de Rochequelaune 
 A.E. George - Napoleon 
 Blanche Forsythe - Agnes 
 Austin Leigh - General Coulaincourt 
 Frank Cochrane - Pierre 
 Fernand Mailly - Talleyrand 
 R.F. Symons - Major Olivier 
 Philip Renouf - Jacques

See also
 The Fighting Eagle (1927)
 The Adventures of Gerard (1970)

References

External links
 

1915 films
1915 war films
1910s historical films
British war films
British historical films
British silent feature films
Films directed by Bert Haldane
Films based on British novels
Films set in France
Films set in the 1810s
Napoleonic Wars films
Films based on works by Arthur Conan Doyle
Depictions of Napoleon on film
Cultural depictions of Charles Maurice de Talleyrand-Périgord
British black-and-white films
1910s English-language films
1910s British films